Sapporo City Transportation Bureau (札幌市交通局, Sapporo-shi Kōtsū-kyoku) is a public organization of transportation in Sapporo, Japan. The organization operates subways and a tram. It was founded in 1927, when the city took private tram lines. The bureau also started to operate bus lines from 1930, subways from 1971. However, from 1990s, the bureau has been suffering from huge deficits. It handed over its bus lines to a private operator in 2004. The bureau introduced a smart card called SAPICA on January 30, 2009.

Transportations
Sapporo Municipal Subway
Sapporo Street Car

External links
 Official website

Transport in Sapporo
Sapporo Municipal Subway
Intermodal transport authorities in Japan